2099 Öpik, provisional designation , is a dark and eccentric asteroid and Mars-crosser from the inner regions of the asteroid belt, approximately 5.1 kilometers in diameter.

The asteroid was discovered on 8 November 1977, by American astronomer Eleanor Helin at the Palomar Observatory in California, and named after Estonian astronomer Ernst Öpik.

Orbit and classification 

Öpik orbits the Sun in the inner main-belt at a distance of 1.5–3.1 AU once every 3 years and 6 months (1,277 days). Its orbit has an eccentricity of 0.36 and an inclination of 27° with respect to the ecliptic. The first used precovery was taken at the discovering observatory in 1970, extending the asteroid's observation arc by 7 years prior to its discovery.

Physical characteristics 

Originally, the asteroid's spectral type was that of a bright S-type asteroid in the Tholen classification. More recently, it has been characterized as a dark Ch-type, a hydrated subtype of the carbonaceous C-type asteroids in the SMASS classification, which is in agreement with its low albedo (below).

Diameter and albedo 

According to the survey carried out by NASA's Wide-field Infrared Survey Explorer with its subsequent NEOWISE mission, Öpik measures 5.17 kilometers in diameter and its surface has an albedo of 0.05. The Collaborative Asteroid Lightcurve Link assumes a standard albedo for carbonaceous asteroids of 0.057 and calculates a diameter of 5.12 kilometers with an absolute magnitude of 15.18.

Rotation period 

In 2005, a photometric lightcurve analysis by several astronomers including Pierre Antonini, rendered a rotation period of  hours and with a brightness amplitude of 0.21 in magnitude, superseding the results of an observation from the 1990s that gave a longer period of 9.3 hours.

Naming 

This minor planet was named after Estonian astronomer and astrophysicist, Ernst Öpik (1893–1985), who has influenced many fields of astronomy during his 60-year long career. He is noted for developing the discipline of statistical celestial mechanics and for methods to estimate the lifetimes of planet-crossing asteroids. In the early 1950s, he calculated the impact probability of Mars-crossing asteroids with Mars, and concluded that a search for impact craters on Mars would be a fruitful. Fourteen years later, Martian craters were discovered by Mariner 4. The official  was published by the Minor Planet Center on 1 November 1978.

References

External links 
 Asteroid Lightcurve Database (LCDB), query form (info )
 Dictionary of Minor Planet Names, Google books
 Asteroids and comets rotation curves, CdR – Observatoire de Genève, Raoul Behrend
 Discovery Circumstances: Numbered Minor Planets (1)-(5000) – Minor Planet Center
 
 

002099
Discoveries by Eleanor F. Helin
Named minor planets
002099
002099
19771108